Anthony James Nelson (12 April 1930 – 27 August 2022) was a Welsh professional footballer who played in the Football League for Newport County and Bournemouth as a centre half.

His father was footballer Jimmy Nelson who was born in Scotland (playing for the national team four times) and brought up in Northern Ireland, but settled in Wales.

References

1930 births
2022 deaths
Footballers from Cardiff
Welsh footballers
Association football defenders
Newport County A.F.C. players
Bristol City F.C. players
AFC Bournemouth players
English Football League players
AFC Bournemouth non-playing staff
Poole Town F.C. managers
Welsh football managers
Welsh people of Scottish descent